Dashdavaagiin Amartüvshin (Mongolian: Дашдаваагийн Амартүвшин) is a male Mongolian judoka. He won the silver medal in the extra-lightweight (60 kg) division at the 2013 World Judo Championships.

References

External links
 
 

1987 births
Living people
Mongolian male judoka
Judoka at the 2010 Asian Games
Judoka at the 2018 Asian Games
Asian Games competitors for Mongolia
Judoka at the 2020 Summer Olympics
Olympic judoka of Mongolia
21st-century Mongolian people